Triple-click is the action of clicking a computer mouse button three times quickly without moving the mouse. Along with clicking and double-clicking, triple-clicking allows three different actions to be associated with the same mouse button.  Criticism of the double-click mechanism is even more valid for triple-clicks.  However, few applications assign critical actions to a triple click.

Examples of usage

On text
In most text processing programs and edit controls triple-clicking with the primary mouse button (the left button for right-handers) on the text selects the entire line. If the edit control is not multiline, the entire text is selected.

Microsoft Word
A triple-click within a paragraph in the text area selects the entire paragraph.
A triple-click in the left margin (when the mouse pointer is an up-and-to-the-right arrow) selects the entire document.

Microsoft Works
A triple-click within a paragraph in the text area selects the line.
A triple-click in the left margin (when the mouse pointer is an up-and-to-the-right arrow) selects the entire document.

Corel WordPerfect
A triple-click within a paragraph in the text area selects the sentence.
A triple-click in the left margin (when the mouse pointer is an up-and-to-the-right arrow) selects the entire document.

Outlook and Outlook Express
A triple-click within a paragraph in the text area selects the entire paragraph.

Text fields
A triple-click in a text entry field (a text entry widget) selects the entire line of text. This is a standard feature of the widgets themselves, so works in most applications, on Linux as well as Windows.

Quark Express
A triple-click selects the current line.
Four clicks selects the current paragraph.
Five clicks selects the whole document.

Web browsers

Firefox 3.0
In Firefox 3.0 a triple-click will highlight all text within any single HTML element on the page.

Firefox 3.5
In Firefox 3.5  and upwards, a triple-click selects the entire paragraph.  If the triple click is inside a content editable element, and is on the first paragraph, it selects the text, and the opening tag of the  element.

Internet Explorer 7
In Internet Explorer 7 a triple-click will highlight all text within any single HTML element on the page. If there is an article with multiple paragraphs one can highlight an entire paragraph with a triple-click.

Opera
In Opera a triple-click will select all text within a sentence while automatically popping up a list of commands to apply to the selected text. A quadruple-click will select all text within a single paragraph while keeping the aforementioned popup open.

Safari 3.0
In Safari 3.0 a triple-click will highlight all text within any single HTML element on the page. If there is an article with multiple paragraphs one can highlight an entire paragraph with a triple-click.

Chrome
In Google Chrome (and by extension ChromeOS), triple-clicking any part of a Web page will cause the nearest text node to be highlighted completely.

Adjusting speed
Adjusting speed of triple-click depends on the operating system:
On Windows XP triple-clicking has the same time as double-click and changing the double-click setting affects triple-click behavior as well.

See also

 Single-click
 Double-click

References

User interface techniques